The 1954 season was the Hawthorn Football Club's 30th season in the Victorian Football League and the 53rd overall.

Fixture

Premiership Season

Ladder

References

Hawthorn Football Club seasons